Lake Corpus Christi is a reservoir in coastal southern Texas.  The lake was created by impoundment of the Nueces River by the Wesley E. Seale Dam opened in 1958. The lake and the dam that creates it are managed by the City of Corpus Christi.  Lake Corpus Christi was originally known as Lake Lovenskiold.  It is often referred to as Lake Mathis because of its location.

Geography
It is an artificial lake owned by the city of Corpus Christi, four miles southwest of Mathis on the Nueces River at the intersection of the Live Oak, San Patricio, and Jim Wells county lines (at 28°03' N, 97°52' W). The lake has a conservation surface area of 19,336 acres, a drainage area of 16,656 square miles, and a conservation storage capacity of 269,900 acre-feet. It serves as a source of municipal water supply. Wesley E. Seale Dam, a seventy-five-foot-high earthen dam, was engineered by Ambursen Engineering and constructed by Henry B. Zachry. The resulting lake submerged the old Mathis Dam. In 1934 the state leased 288 acres surrounding the lake from the city of Corpus Christi for a park. Around the lake, flat to rolling terrain is surfaced by deep, fine sandy loam that supports hardwood forest, brush, and grasses.

Uses
Lake Corpus Christi provides drinking water for the city of Corpus Christi. The reservoir also provides good fishing opportunities, especially for largemouth bass and catfish. Lake Corpus Christi State Park provides camping and picnicking areas and two fishing piers. Camp Karankawa is a Boy Scout of America camp operated by the South Texas Council, opened in 1944. It's 130 acres on the shore of Lake Corpus Christi is leased from Lake Corpus Christi State Park on a 99-year lease. Camp Green Hill is a Girl Scout camp located on 50 acres on the lake operated by the Girl Scouts of Greater South Texas.

Fish and plant species
Lake Corpus Christi has been stocked with species of fish intended to improve the utility of the reservoir for recreational fishing.  Fish present in Lake Corpus Christi include crappie, white bass, catfish, and largemouth bass, sunfish, bluegill and Alligator gar. Plant life in the lake includes water stargrass, water lettuce, water hyacinth, American pondweed, coontail, rushes, and cattail. The American Alligator (Alligator mississippiensis) also inhabit the lake.

See also
Corpus Christi, Texas
Nueces River

References

External links 
 Lake Corpus Christi - Texas Parks & Wildlife Department
 Lake Corpus Christi - Handbook of Texas Online

Corpus Christi
Protected areas of San Patricio County, Texas
Protected areas of Live Oak County, Texas
Protected areas of Jim Wells County, Texas
Nueces River
Bodies of water of San Patricio County, Texas
Bodies of water of Live Oak County, Texas
Bodies of water of Jim Wells County, Texas